Ptychadena is a genus of frogs in the grassland frog family, Ptychadenidae. They are distributed in Sub-Saharan Africa, as well as nilotic Egypt. The common names of this genus are ridged frogs and grass frogs. This type of family have many different characteristics such as the species, Ptychadena neumanni who have long hindlimbs and a large ear drum compared to the Ptychadena erlangeri, for example. They also have a unique bone structure which is a fusion between the presacral vertebrae and sacrum.

Species
The following species are recognised in the genus Ptychadena :

References

 
Ptychadenidae
Amphibians of Africa
Amphibian genera
Taxa named by George Albert Boulenger